Wallis "Wally" Harris (born November 23, 1935) is a Canadian former National Hockey League referee whose career spanned for 39 years including 17 as an NHL on ice official, 3 as the NHL's first Director of Officiating and 16 as an NHL supervisor of officials. Harris refereed many historical hockey games, such as the famous 3-3 tie between the Montreal Canadiens and the Soviet Union's Central Red Army team on December 31, 1975, a game fondly remembered and widely regarded as one of the best ever played. Over the course of his hockey career, he has refereed 953 regular season games, 85 Playoff games, and 6 Stanley Cup Final series.

Early life 
Harris was born in Montreal, Quebec, Canada.

Career
In 1951, Harris played for the Lachine Maroons in the Quebec Amateur Hockey Association (QAHA), becoming a referee in 1956.

In 1963, he signed his first contract with the NHL, officiating for various leagues, such as Western Hockey Association, Central Hockey League, and American Hockey League.

NHL 
Starting in 1966, Harris started officiating in the NHL, refereeing 953 regular season games and 85 playoff games until 1983. His first game was on December 11, 1966, between the Montreal Canadiens and New York Rangers. On January 13, 1968, he refereed the game that resulted in an unfortunate incident where Bill Masterton suffered head injury resulting in his death. In 1983, he was the first NHL referee to officiate the Spengler cup and did so for three years. During this time he was also involved in various training camps in Innsbruck Austria, Canazei Italy and Davos Switzerland. His last game was the final playoff series on May 12, 1983 between the Edmonton Oilers and New York Islanders. In 1989, Harris was assistant director of officials to Brian Lewis. In 2002, he retired from the NHL.

References

1935 births
Living people
National Hockey League officials
Ice hockey people from Montreal